Asgardian may refer to:

 Of Asgard, a location associated with the gods in Norse cosmology
 Of Asgard (comics), the fictional realm in Marvel Comics
Asgardians of the Galaxy, a team of superheroes
 Of Asgardia, a micronation in space
 Asgardian (Young Avengers), former name of Wiccan, a fictional character in Marvel Comics

See also

Asgard (disambiguation)